FC Krystal Chortkiv is a Ukrainian football team.  The team is located in Chortkiv, Ukraine. It participates in the regional championships in Ternopil Oblast.

In 2016 it merged with a student team FC Ternopil-Peduniversytet into FC Chortkiv-Peduniversytet.

History
1946: Founded as FC Dynamo Chortkiv
1986: Renamed FC Tsukrovyk Chortkiv
1990: Renamed FC Krystal Chortkiv
1999: Renamed FC Avianosets Chortkiv
2005: Renamed FC Chortkiv
2016: Renamed FC Chortkiv-Peduniversytet
2017: Renamed FSC Krystal ChortkivHonours
 Football Championship of Ternopil Oblast Winners (7):' 1955, 1959 (both as FC Chortkiv), 1964 (Druzhba), 1989 (Tsukrovyk), 2002, 2003 (both as Avianosets), 2013 (FC Chortkiv)

League and cup history

See also
 FC Nyva Ternopil
 FC Ternopil

References

External links
 Krystal Chortkiv at footballfacts.ru
 FC Krystal Chortkiv at AAFU
 History of football clubs, Ternopil Oblast (История футбольных клубов, ТЕРНОПОЛЬСКАЯ ОБЛАСТЬ). personal website.

 
Sport in Chortkiv
Football clubs in Ternopil Oblast
Amateur football clubs in Ukraine
Association football clubs established in 1946
1946 establishments in Ukraine